Susan Low Bloch is an American professor specializing in Constitutional law and communications law at Georgetown University Law Center, who is widely quoted in the press on her interpretation of the Constitution of the United States.

Biography
Bloch received her B.A. from Smith College in 1966 with Phi Beta Kappa honors. She then pursued graduate studies in mathematics and computer science at the University of Michigan, receiving M.A. degrees in 1968 and 1972. She earned her J.D. in 1975, graduating first in her class, summa cum laude and Order of the Coif from University of Michigan Law School, where she was notes editor of the Michigan Law Review. Following graduation, she served as a clerk for Judge Spottswood Robinson III of the United States Court of Appeals for the District of Columbia and during the 1976 Term for Thurgood Marshall of the Supreme Court of the United States. 

In 1982, Bloch joined the faculty of the Georgetown University Law Center as an assistant professor.  She has served on the District of Columbia Bar Board of Governors, American Law Institute and United States Supreme Court Historical Society.

Her co-authored case books include Inside the Supreme Court: The Institution and Its Procedures and Supreme Court Politics: The Institution and Its Procedures. In 2013, she co-wrote with Vicki C. Jackson, Federalism: A Reference Guide to the United States Constitution.

Personal life
In 1966, she married attorney Richard Bloch, and they have two children who are both lawyers.

See also
 List of law clerks of the Supreme Court of the United States (Seat 10)

References

Selected publications

External links
 Faculty Site at Georgetown University Law Center
 Author listing at WorldCat
 
 Appearance on Charlie Rose show

Year of birth missing (living people)
1940s births
Living people
Law clerks of the Supreme Court of the United States
Georgetown University Law Center faculty
University of Michigan Law School alumni
University of Michigan alumni
Smith College alumni
American scholars of constitutional law
20th-century American lawyers
21st-century American lawyers
American legal scholars
American women legal scholars
American women academics
21st-century American women